In enzymology, a sorbitol-6-phosphate dehydrogenase is an enzyme that catalyzes the chemical reaction

D-sorbitol 6-phosphate + NAD+  D-fructose 6-phosphate + NADH + H+

Thus, the two substrates of this enzyme are D-sorbitol 6-phosphate and NAD+, whereas its 3 products are D-fructose 6-phosphate, NADH, and H+.

This enzyme belongs to the family of oxidoreductases, specifically those acting on the CH-OH group of donor with NAD+ or NADP+ as acceptor. The systematic name of this enzyme class is D-sorbitol-6-phosphate:NAD+ 2-oxidoreductase. Other names in common use include ketosephosphate reductase, ketosephosphate reductase, D-sorbitol 6-phosphate dehydrogenase, D-sorbitol-6-phosphate dehydrogenase, sorbitol-6-P-dehydrogenase, and D-glucitol-6-phosphate dehydrogenase. This enzyme participates in fructose and mannose metabolism.

References 

 
 

EC 1.1.1
NADH-dependent enzymes
Enzymes of unknown structure